Tu Shengqiao (born 9 November 1968) is a former Chinese international football midfielder who played for Hubei WISCO, Qianwei Huandao and Guangzhou Matsunichi while also representing China in the 1988 Asian Cup.

Playing career

Tu Shengqiao was considered a talented youngster and was soon part of the Chinese U-23 team that was called China B and who were allowed to take part in the Chinese football league pyramid. His time with them was extremely successful and he was even able to win the Chinese league title with them in the 1989 league season. His time at the China B team also saw him called up to the senior team, where he took part in the 1988 Asian Cup and aided China to a fourth-place finish. He eventually returned to his hometown of Wuhan to play for Hubei WISCO before joining Qianwei Huandao where he won the second-tier division with them in the 1996 league campaign before ending his career with Guangzhou Matsunichi.

Career statistics

International statistics

Honours

China B
Chinese Jia-A League: 1989

Qianwei Huandao
Chinese Jia-B League: 1996

References

External links
Team China Stats
Player profile

1968 births
Living people
Chinese footballers
Footballers from Hubei
Wuhan Guanggu players
Chongqing Liangjiang Athletic F.C. players
Association football defenders
Association football midfielders